Momchil Nikolov (born 1985) is a Bulgarian chess grandmaster.

He earned his International Master title in 2007, and grandmaster title in 2010.

He won the Bulgarian Chess Championship in 2016, and has also won a number of strong open tournaments including Glasgow 2012, Monthey 2012, Apokoronas 2015, Albena Vivacom 2015,  Guingamp 2016,  Albena 2016, Primorsko 2016, Lille 2017, Athens 2017, Primorsko 2017, Noisiel 2018,  Capelle-la-Grande 2018 (joint winner), Athens 2018, Heusenstamm 2018 and Guingamp 2019 .

References

External links

Momchil Nikolov chess games at 365Chess.com

Chess grandmasters
Bulgarian chess players
1985 births
Living people